Sir Geoffrey de Luterel I (c. 1158–1218), was a courtier and confidant of King John, whom he served as a minister.

Origins
He was born around 1158 in Gamston, Nottinghamshire, England, the son of Alfred de Luterel (1105-1170).

Relations with King John 
In the time of Richard I, the lands of Sir Geoffrey De Luterel, in the counties Nottingham and Derby, were seized by the crown, for his adherence to the Earl of Moreton, but he was compensated, upon the accession of the earl to the throne, as King John, by extensive territorial and other grants.

He travelled with King John on missions to Ireland and Italy and in about 1210 was granted lands near Dublin, Ireland where he established the township of Luttrellstown, near Clonsilla. In 1215 he was also granted the townland of Cratloe in County Clare, including the Cratloe Oak Woods.

In 1215, John appointed Sir Geoffrey Luttrell to be his sole agent in negotiations with regard to the dower of Queen Berengaria, commissioning him at the same time to join with the Archbishops of Bordeaux and Dublin in denouncing to the Pope the rebellious barons who had recently extorted the Great Charter of English Liberties.  In one of the documents connected with this business, he is styled  'nobilis vir' .  His mission was so far successful that Innocent the Third annulled the Charter, suspended the Archbishop of Canterbury, and excommunicated the barons, but it is uncertain whether Sir Geoffrey Luttrell was the one of those who conveyed the papal bull from Rome to England.

Marriage and children
On 26 February 1190 he married Frethesant Paynel (alias Paganel, etc.), heiress of several estates including  Irnham, Lincolnshire and  East Quantoxhead, Somerset and others in Yorkshire, which thus passed to the Luttrell family. By his wife he had 3 children:
Andrew de Lutrel (1st Baron Irnham) (1205-1264) married abt 1225 Petronella daughter of Philip de la Mare.  Their son is Sir Geoffrey Luttrell, Lord Luttrell (b bef 1235 d abt 1269).
Robert de Lutrel. 
Margeret de Luterel

Frethyesant Paynel married second, Henry de Newmarch in 1219.

Henry de Newmarch was dead in 1239; and Frethesant appears to have married Roger de Thrybergh as her third husband.  In 1240 Roger de Triberge and Frethesant his wife quitclaimed for themselves and her heirs to Andrew Luterel and his heirs a moiety of the manor of Hooton Pagnell and all the lands and tenements which were of the heritage of William Paynel; and Andrew granted them land in Hooton, to hold to them and the heirs of Frethesant of him and his heirs.

Later life and death 
In 1216 he was declared non compos mentis and was placed in the custody of his brother, John Luttrell. Sir Geoffrey d. in the 2nd year of Henry III., 1218, and was s. by his son, Sir Andrew De Luteral, of Irnham, county Lincoln.

On 15 May 1218 the sheriff of Yorkshire was ordered to take security from Henry de Newmarch for 40 marks which he had undertaken to pay for having as his wife Frethesant widow of Geoffrey Luterel, should she be willing, and to give him seisin of her lands.  Frethesant Paynel occurs as the wife of Henry de Newmarch in 1219, when her lands included a moiety of Barton[-le-Street] in Ryedale wapentake, a moiety of [Nether] Silton i Birdforth wapentake, and 10li worth of land in Strafforth wapentake.

Legacy 
He was the head of the three main branches of the Luttrell family, namely:
Luttrell of Luttrellstown and Luttrellstown Castle, Ireland, held for almost 600 years by his descendants, created in 1768 Barons Irnham, in 1781 Viscounts Carhampton and in 1785 Earls of Carhampton.
Luttrell  of East Quantoxhead, Somerset, which family went on to acquire nearby Dunster Castle in 1376, which it held until the extinction of the male line in 1737, but which continued to be held via a female line (which adopted the surname and arms of Luttrell) until 1976 when donated to the National Trust. 
Luttrell of Irnham, Lincolnshire, a member of which branch, Sir Geoffrey Luttrell III (1276-1345), commissioned the Luttrell Psalter (c.1340-1345), and which branch became extinct in about 1418.

References 

 Family and Estate papers of the Luttrell family of Dunster, Somerset Record Office reference DD/L

External links 
 
 
 Ball, Francis Elrington,  A History of the County Dublin, Volume 4, Chapter 1, Dublin, Ireland, 1906., Volume 4, Chapter 1.
 Ball, Francis Elrington,  A History of the County Dublin, Volume 4, Chapter 1, Dublin, Ireland, 1906., Volume 4, Chapter 1.  ALTERNATE SITE
 Tyler, Lyon Gardiner, LL.D. (Editorial Supervisor), Encyclopedia of Virginia Biography, Volume IV, Richmond, New York, 1915.
    Luttrell family website
  Luttrell family of Ireland from Ask about Ireland

1150s births
13th-century English people
Anglo-Normans
Medieval English knights
English landowners
1218 deaths
Geoffrey